is a former Japanese football player.

Playing career
Hirose was born in Saitama on June 6, 1965. After graduating from high school, he joined Japan Soccer League club Mitsubishi Motors (later Urawa Reds) in 1984. He played many matches as offensive midfielder in first season, and became a regular player from next season. The club also won the 3rd place 1986–87 and 1987–88 season. After that, the club performance was sluggish for long time. In 1992, Japan Soccer League was folded and founded new league J1 League. However the club finished at bottom place in 1993 and 1994 season. In 1995, he was converted to defensive midfielder by new manager Holger Osieck and the club finished at 4th place. He retired end of 2000 season. He played 326 matches and scored 31 goals for the club in 17 seasons.

Club statistics

References

External links

library.footballjapan.jp

1965 births
Living people
Association football people from Saitama Prefecture
Japanese footballers
Japan Soccer League players
J1 League players
J2 League players
Urawa Red Diamonds players
Association football midfielders